Poochudava is a 1997 Indian Tamil-language romance film directed by Udayasankar and produced by K. Jayaraman. The film stars Abbas and Simran. Manivannan, Nagesh, Kalpana, Jai Ganesh, Chinni Jayanth, PC Ramakrishnan and Kavitha play supporting roles. The film was dubbed in Telugu as Pelli Kala Vachinde Bala.

Plot
Abbas (as Kannan) play the role of a rebellious college student in this movie. While, Simran (as Nandhini) acts as his love lady. The first half of the movie is about how Abbas and Simran have their pet fights and then the second half of the movie is about how they both join hands together to fight against her parents' opposition.

Cast
Abbas as Kannan
Simran as Nandhini
P. C. Ramakrishna as Nandhini's father
Kalpana as Arul
Kavitha
Manivannan
Nagesh
Chinni Jayanth
Jai Ganesh
Junior Balaiah
Madhan Bob
Halwa Vasu
Vaiyapuri
AR Murugadoss

Production
The film went through development hell and took a long time to complete. The original producers, MG Pictures,  later transferred it to Jayalakshmi Movie Makers owing to financial problems. It was the first film to cast Abbas and Simran together, though VIP (1997), launched much later with both of them, was released earlier.

Abbas and Simran simultaneously also worked on another Telugu project titled Priya O Priya during the making of Poochudava.

Soundtrack
The film soundtrack features score and 5 songs composed by Sirpi

References

1997 films
1990s Tamil-language films
Films directed by Udayasankar